Robert Wintner is an author and founder of Snorkel Bob's shops throughout Hawaii.

Wintner's fiction tends to be led by characters seeking reason in nature. Two of his novels were optioned for movie production in Los Angeles (The Modern Outlaws and Whirlaway). Whirlaway was a Maui County hot book listing for 15 years. His short story collection, Wintner's Reserve, was chosen for a Book 'n a Beach Chair of the Month Main Selection.

Snorkel Bob's Reality Guide to Hawaii is non-fiction and written in the same voice as all Snorkel Bob productions, with guidance on snorkel sites, beaches, reefs, hazards et al., and other tourist info.

Book 'n a Beach ChairWintner has focused on his career as an environmental and animal rights activist, primarily against the saltwater aquarium trade.

Bibliography

As Robert Wintner

As Snorkel Bob 

 Formerly Snorkel Bob's Underwater & (get down) Underground Guide to Hawaii

References

External links

20th-century American novelists
21st-century American novelists
American male novelists
Living people
Novelists from Hawaii
American male short story writers
20th-century American short story writers
21st-century American short story writers
20th-century American male writers
21st-century American male writers
20th-century American non-fiction writers
21st-century American non-fiction writers
American male non-fiction writers
Year of birth missing (living people)